Scott Eric Fredrickson (born August 19, 1967) is an American former Major League Baseball right-handed pitcher.  He is an alumnus of Judson High School in Converse, Texas, and the University of Texas at Austin.

Drafted by the San Diego Padres in the 14th round of the 1990 MLB amateur draft, Fredrickson would make his Major League Baseball debut with the Colorado Rockies on April 30, 1993, and appeared in his final game on July 23, 1993.

Fredrickson was a member of the inaugural Colorado Rockies team that began play in Major League Baseball in 1993.

Sources

1967 births
Living people
Colorado Rockies players
Baseball players from New Hampshire
Sportspeople from Manchester, New Hampshire
Major League Baseball pitchers
Texas Longhorns baseball players
Spokane Indians players
Waterloo Diamonds players
High Desert Mavericks players
Wichita Wranglers players
Colorado Springs Sky Sox players
Carolina Mudcats players